Veliko Trojstvo is a municipality in Bjelovar-Bilogora County, Croatia. There are a total of 2,741 inhabitants, in the following settlements:

 Ćurlovac, population 261
 Dominkovica, population 50
 Grginac, population 231
 Kegljevac, population 63
 Maglenča, population 316
 Malo Trojstvo, population 158
 Martinac, population 125
 Paulovac, population 99
 Veliko Trojstvo, population 1,197
 Višnjevac, population 116
 Vrbica, population 125

In the 2001 census, 97% were Croats.

References

Municipalities of Croatia
Populated places in Bjelovar-Bilogora County